Eckart Berkes (9 February 1949 – 24 September 2014) was a German hurdler who competed in the 1972 Summer Olympics. He was born in Worms.

References

1949 births
2014 deaths
People from Worms, Germany
German male hurdlers
Olympic athletes of West Germany
Athletes (track and field) at the 1972 Summer Olympics
Sportspeople from Rhineland-Palatinate